Nargess is a Persian female name, as well as the Persian word for flower Narcissus.

List of people with the given name
Narges Kalhor, Iranian film director
Nargess, a character in the Iranian film Nargess
Nargis, Indian actress

Persian feminine given names